EchoStar XIV is an American geostationary communications satellite which is operated by EchoStar. It is positioned in geostationary orbit at a longitude of 119° West, from where it is used to provide high-definition television direct broadcasting services to the continental United States for Dish Network.

EchoStar XIV was built by Space Systems/Loral, and is based on the LS-1300 satellite bus.

The launch of EchoStar XIV was conducted by International Launch Services, using a Proton-M carrier rocket with a Briz-M upper stage. The launch occurred from Site 200/39 at the Baikonur Cosmodrome in Kazakhstan, at 18:26:57 UTC on 20 March 2010. The launch successfully placed EchoStar XIV into a geosynchronous transfer orbit.

See also

2010 in spaceflight

References

Spacecraft launched in 2010
Satellites using the SSL 1300 bus
Communications satellites in geostationary orbit
Spacecraft launched by Proton rockets
E14